is an asteroid, classified as a near-Earth object and potentially hazardous asteroid of the Apollo group, likely smaller than one kilometer in diameter.

It was scheduled to be observed by Goldstone radar in May 2013. It is due to make another close pass on 23 May 2131, coming as close as 0.0248 AU. It was discovered on 21 July 2002 by astronomers of the Near-Earth Asteroid Tracking survey at Palomar Observatory in California. With an absolute magnitude of 18.8, the diameter is estimated to between 460 and 1030 meters.

References

External links 
 
 
 

163364
163364
163364
Near-Earth objects in 2013
20020721